Rich School District is a school district located in Rich County in northern Utah, United States. It serves all the communities within Rich County and is the fourth smallest of the 41 school districts within the state in terms of student enrollment.

Communities served
The Rich School District serves the following communities:

 Garden City
 Laketown
 Randolph
 Woodruff

Schools
The following are schools within the Rich County School District:

Elementary schools

 North Rich Elementary School - Laketown
 South Rich Elementary School - Randolph

Middle schools

 Rich Middle School - Laketown

High schools

 Rich High School - Randolph

See also

 List of school districts in Utah
 Northeastern Utah Educational Services

References

External links
 

School districts in Utah
Education in Rich County, Utah